Oxalis caprina (Goat's foot) is a short-stemmed South African plant with bluish flowers from the genus Oxalis.

References

 The Plant List
 Global Compendium of Weeds
 Memidex

caprina